Nebil Caidi (born 25 September 1988) is an Italian of Moroccan origin football defender who plays for amateur-level side USD Classe.

Club career
A Cesena youth product, he also played for Teramo between 2012 and 2019.

On 14 December 2019, he agreed on a 1.5-year contract with Ravenna.

References

External links

1988 births
Sportspeople from Ravenna
Italian people of Moroccan descent
Italian sportspeople of African descent
Living people
Italian footballers
Association football defenders
A.C. Cesena players
Valenzana Mado players
A.C. Giacomense players
F.C. Pavia players
S.S. Teramo Calcio players
Ravenna F.C. players
Serie B players
Serie C players
Footballers from Emilia-Romagna